This is a list of mosques in Turkmenistan.

See also
 Islam in Turkmenistan
 Lists of mosques

References

External links

 

 
Turkmenistan
Mosques